There have been 79 National Rover Moots in New Zealand. The first was the Dominion Rover Scout Moot at New Brighton Racecourse, Christchurch in 1936 although there was a North island Moot in 1935.

The Moot is held annually over Easter. The event entails three days of scheduled activities which include a community service project, sporting competitions, and a selection of day tours. A number of awards recognising Rover Crews and individuals for the service and programme they have run over the preceding year are awarded as part of the Moot.

The 2020 Moot was originally scheduled to be Déjà Vu Moot however, due to the Covid-19 pandemic, the event had to be postponed, and the Moot was instead held online. In 2022 the Moot was postponed due to the Covid-19 pandemic, due to concerns about organising and running the event while New Zealand was in the Red Light setting of the COVID-19 Protection Framework.1994 was Green Moot not The Moot

Awards 
The following awards are presented annually at moot:

Zulu Shield - Presented to the Crew with the most complete Log Book, which should show that the Crew has maintained a balanced programme based on the aims of the Rover Programme

Baden Powel Lodge No. 381 Service Shield - Presented to the Crew with the most extensive service over the previous year.

Helen Thomas Memorial Trophy - Awarded to a Rover, nominated by their Crew, as having shown outstanding commitment to service within Scouting and the community, setting an example to those around them, and who lives by the Scout Law. The nominee may be a member who has not been in Rovers for more than two years. Helen died tragically in a rafting accident while attending the 48th National Rover Moot in Timaru.

Moot Spirit Awards 
Fergus McLaren Banner  - Initially awarded for camping standards at the Moot, but now awarded to the Rover Crew who best participates and shows good Rover spirit during the weekend and is considered the premier award for this section of Scouting. The banner that is currently presented has been in use from 2014 and is the fourth banner. The previous banners commenced use in 1944, 1976 and 1986. The banner is named after 2nd Lt. Fergus McLaren, a Dunedin Rover Scout, who was killed in Greece during the Second World War.

Eastman Shield (Fastest Rover at the Moot) - Awarded to the individual Rover who contributes the most to the Moot spirit. Named for the Eastman Rover Crew from Palmerston North.

Nymph Trophy - Awarded to the crew whose female members contribute most to the success of the Moot.

Macho Trophy - Awarded to the crew whose male members contribute most to the success of the Moot.

Previous Moots
List based on the New Zealand Badgers Club "The Histories Book: A History of New Zealand Scout District Badges" 4th Edition 2014 (preprint edition)

References

Rover Moots
Scouting events
Scouting-related lists
Recurring events established in 1936
Rover Moots
Rover Moots